Fedje is the largest island in Fedje Municipality in Vestland county, Norway. The  island is home to almost all of the municipality's residents. The island sits west of the Fedjefjorden, south of the mouth of the Fensfjorden, and north of the islands of Øygarden. The North Sea lies to the west of the island. The main population center on the island is the village of Fedje on the northern coast of the island. The southern coast of the island is the site of the other village on the island, Stormark. Hellisøy Lighthouse lies just off the southwestern coast of the island.

See also 
 List of islands of Norway

References 

Islands of Vestland
Fedje